Number 10 is a 1992 album by J. J. Cale. It was his tenth studio album since his debut in 1971.

Recording
Number 10 was Cale’s second LP for Silvertone.  Compared to his albums in the 70s and 80s, he employs fewer session players for this album, yet still achieves his signature sound.  Before releasing 1990’s Travel-Log, he went on hiatus, not releasing an album in six years.  Notoriously wary of the spotlight, Cale quietly went about his own business his way, and in an era of fuzz guitar and grunge, he delivered his own unique blend of musical styles augmented by his laid-back vocal delivery.  In his AllMusic review of the album, Roch Parisien contends:

The song “Traces” features Christine Lakeland on synthesizer and foreshadows the synth-heavy material Cale would produce on his next two albums.  Cale, who started his career as an engineer in Leon Russell's home studio in the late sixties, told Vintage Guitar in 2004, “I love the engineering part; that’s why I put out a lot of synthesizer-type records – I like that sound. Trouble is, everybody’s doing that now. On the radio, chances are you won’t hear a real drummer. I was doing that all the way back to ‘Call Me The Breeze' and ‘Crazy Mama.’ Those were drum machines.”  Most of the songs on Number 10 deal with the joys of love (“Shady Grove,” “Feeling in Love,” “Low Rider”) or the loss of it (“Passion,” “She’s in Love,” “Traces”).   The prophetic “Digital Blues” bemoans the loss of individuality in the face of advancing technology, with Cale singing, “I got the digital blues, my soul is just another number,” while the wry “Take Out Some Insurance” addresses the theme of mortality.

Reception
AllMusic: “It would be easy to imagine Number 10 getting completely buried behind a wash of '90s white noise, but for those prepared to kick off their boots and sit a spell, Cale's latest offers up some seductive rewards.”

Track listing

 "Lonesome Train" - 3:09
 "Digital Blues" - 3:33
 "Feeling In Love" - 3:20
 "Artificial Paradise" - 4:02
 "Passion" - 2:25
 "Take Out Some Insurance" - 2:37
 "Jailer" - 2:50
 "Low Rider" - 2:45
 "Traces" - 3:25
 "She's In Love" - 3:45
 "Shady Grove" - 3:54
 "Roll On Mama" 2:35

Personnel 

 J. J. Cale : Vocals, Guitar
 Bill Boatman : Fiddle ( Tr. 6 ) 
 Spooner Oldham : Organ ( Tr. 7 ) 
 Christine Lakeland : Synthesizer (DX-7) ( Tr. 9 ) 
 Tim Drummond : Bass ( Tr. 7 ) 
 Nick Rather : Bass ( Tr. 6 ) 
 Jimmy Karstein : Percussion ( Tr. 11 )

References

J. J. Cale albums
1992 albums